Hard Core is the first solo album by Canadian musician Paul Dean, released in 1989. The first track, "Sword & Stone", was demoed by Kiss for their Crazy Nights album in 1987, and later additionally recorded by the German rockers, Bonfire, in 1989 for the  film Shocker and its accompanying soundtrack. The Bryan Adams-written "Draw the Line" was originally recorded by Ted Nugent with Brian Howe on lead vocals in 1984 on his Penetrator album.

Track listing 
"Sword & Stone" (Desmond Child, Paul Stanley, Bruce Kulick) - 4:06  
"Doctor" (Paul Dean) - 4:52 
"Draw the Line" (Bryan Adams, Jim Vallance) - 4:11 
"Dirty Fingers" (Taylor Rhodes, Tom DeLuca) - 4:02 
"Under the Gun" (Dean, Mike Reno, Jon Bon Jovi, Richie Sambora) - 3:39 
"Action" (Dean, Matt Frenette, Ken "Spider" Sinnaeve, Kenny Shields, Daryl Guthiel) - 5:10 
"Down to the Bottom" (Dean) - 5:17 
"Black Sheep" (Dean, Rhodes, Terry Cerney) - 4:09 
"Politics" (Dean, Brian MacLeod, Foster) - 4:53

Musicians 
Paul Dean (vocals, guitar, bass guitar, backing vocals)
Brian MacLeod (drums, keyboards, key bass, backing vocals)
Matt Frenette (drums on track 6)
Spider Sinnaeve (bass guitar on track 6)
Jon Bon Jovi (harp on  track 5)
Dave Steele (backing vocals)
Marc LaFrance (backing vocals)
Ricky Renouf (backing vocals)
Geraldo Dominelli (backing vocals)
Vern Wills (backing vocals)
Frank Felder (backing vocals)
Gregg Sheehan (backing vocals)
Rosalind Keene (backing vocals)
Nashy Nash (backing vocals)

Production 
Produced by Paul Dean and Brian MacLeod.
Mixed by Bob Rock at Little Mountain Sound Studios, Vancouver, BC; except tracks 6, 7 and 9, mixed by Paul Dean.
Recorded at Venture Studios, Vancouver, BC, by Larry Vogel.
Additional overdubs recorded at Little Mountain Sound Studios, Vancouver, BC, by Tim Crich and Ken Lomas; and at Mush Room Studios in Vancouver, BC, by Dale Penner.

Chart positions

References 

1989 albums
Columbia Records albums